Marradong is a former town located  south of Boddington along the road from Pinjarra to Williams.

History
Marradong was the major centre in the region until the 1920s, having been settled by the Batt, Pollard and Fawcett families, and once boasted a shop, post office, hotel, church, telegraph station and a one-roomed school. The town was also the home of the Marradong Road Board, first convened in 1903. After the arrival of the railway in Boddington, most facilities moved there and by 1930 Marradong had been largely abandoned.

All that remains of the town is the tiny St Albans Anglican Church and cemetery (1894), a few old homes in varying states of repair and some palm trees which once stood outside the Laura Hotel.  The agricultural hall was demolished in 1989 and a small fire station has been built on the site.  The locality is now mostly inhabited by local farmers who primarily produce wool, lamb, beef, oats, hay, barley, lupins, canola and timber.

References

External links
 St Albans Cemetery, Marradong

Towns in Western Australia
Shire of Boddington